The Under Secretary of the Treasury for International Affairs is a senior position within the United States Department of the Treasury responsible for advising the Secretary of the Treasury on international economic issues. , the under secretary is Jay Shambaugh.

Overview
The Office of International Affairs (IA), led by the Under Secretary of the Treasury for International Affairs, has oversight of the following:
Office of International Economic Analysis
Assistant Secretary of the Treasury for International Finance and Development
Office of Asia
Office of Europe and Eurasia
Office of Western Hemisphere
Office of Middle East and North Africa
Office of International Monetary Policy
Office of International Development Finance
United States Executive Director of the African Development Bank
United States Executive Director of the International Monetary Fund
United States Executive Director of the World Bank
United States Executive Director of the Asian Development Bank
United States Executive Director of the Inter-American Development Bank
United States Executive Director of the European Bank for Reconstruction and Development
Assistant Secretary of the Treasury for International Markets and Investment Policy
Office of Trade and Investment Policy
Office of Investment, Energy, and Infrastructure
Office of International Financial Markets
Office of Technical Assistance
Assistant Secretary of the Treasury for Investment Security
Office of Investment Security
Committee on Foreign Investment in the United States (CFIUS)

The Office of International Affairs also oversees the operations of the Exchange Stabilization Fund and the U.S.–China Strategic and Economic Dialogue.

Former Under Secretaries
Notable former Under Secretaries include Paul Volcker, David H. McCormick, Timothy D. Adams, John B. Taylor, Timothy F. Geithner, David Mulford, David Malpass, and Lawrence H. Summers.

The office of Under Secretary for International Affairs was vacant for nearly a year, following the November 2013 departure of Lael Brainard, who had been appointed by President Barack Obama in April 2010. On Wednesday, February 12, 2014, the White House Press Office announced that U.S. President Barack Obama had nominated D. Nathan Sheets, of Maryland, to the U.S. Senate for confirmation as her replacement. On September 18, 2014, Sheets was confirmed unanimously by the U.S. Senate for the position.

During the Trump Administration the office was held by Brent McIntosh following the appointment of David Malpass to lead the World Bank.

Duties
The Under Secretary leads the development and implementation of policies in the areas of international finance, trade in financial services, investment, economic development, international debt. It also leads the development of policies on U.S. participation in the International Monetary Fund, the World Bank, and the other multilateral development banks (including the Inter-American Development Bank, the African Development Bank, the Asian Development Bank, and the European Bank for Reconstruction and Development). The Under Secretary also coordinates financial market policy with the G7 industrial nations.

References